NGC 258 is a lenticular galaxy located in the Andromeda constellation. It was discovered by George Stoner in 1848.

References

External links
 

Andromeda (constellation)
Lenticular galaxies
Astronomical objects discovered in 1848
0258
002829